The 1921 SAFL Grand Final was an Australian rules football game contested between the Norwood Football Club and the Port Adelaide Football Club, held at the Adelaide Oval in Adelaide on 8 October 1921. It was the 23rd annual Grand Final of the South Australian Football League, staged to determine the premiers for the 1921 SAFL season. The match, attended by 34,000 spectators, was won by Port Adelaide by a margin of 8 points, marking the club's ninth premiership victory.

Teams 
Port Adelaide's team was not finalised until just before the game with Taylor, Lloyd and Mayne left out of the squad of 21 and Eric Dewar replacing Maurice Allingham.

Scorecard

References 

SANFL Grand Finals
SAFL Grand Final, 1921